Dominick and Dickerman LLC is an investment and merchant banking firm headquartered in New York City with offices in Basel, Switzerland. From 1899 to 2015, the firm was known as Dominick and Dominick. After selling its wealth management business, the firm reverted to its original name, Dominick and Dickerman.

The firm, founded in 1870, is one of the oldest, continuously operated financial services institutions in the United States. Dominick & Dickerman LLC has individual and corporate clients that it serves through three business divisions: Private Wealth Management; Investment Banking; and Institutional Sales. 

Private Wealth Management offers wealth management advice, including investment strategies, asset allocation, wealth and estate planning, insurance products and alternative investments. The Investment Banking team assists public and private corporations around the world by raising capital, developing and implementing strategic merger and acquisition plans, and advising senior management teams on a variety of governance, operations and growth issues.  Institutional Sales recommends and executes trading strategies for institutional clients in the United States and abroad. Dominick & Dominick LLC is a member of the Securities Investor Protection Corporation and the Financial Industry Regulatory Authority.

History

Founding
The company was founded on June 15, 1870 as Dominick & Dickerman by William Gayer Dominick and Watson Bradley Dickerman. Dominick was born in Chicago, and moved to New York as a child. In 1869, at the age of 25, he purchased membership on the New York Stock Exchange. At the NYSE, Dominick met Connecticut-born Dickerman and they went into business forming a stock brokerage firm. Dominick's brothers, George and Bayard Dominick, also joined the Exchange and became partners in the firm.

Dominick & Dickerman opened its first branch in 1889 in Cincinnati, where the firm was one of only two exchange members. A year later, Dickerman left the firm when he was elected president of the New York Stock Exchange. He would serve as president from 1890 to 1892, then return to the firm. His cofounder, William Dominick, died in 1895 at the age of 50 to typhoid fever. Dickerman would retire in 1909, passing away at the age of 77 in 1923.

Dominick & Dickerman changed its name in 1899 to Dominick & Dominick, adding several new partners including Milnor B. Dominick, Andrew V. Stout, J.A. Barnard, and Bernon S. Prentice. The firm was one of the original sources for closed-end funds, launching The Dominick fund, Inc in 1920 by selling 200,000 shares for a raise of $10 million. Despite the stock market crash in 1929, the fund survived and was listed in 1959 on the NYSE before it was merged with Putnam Fund in 1973.

Expansion

In 1936 Dominick & Dominick expanded through acquisition, merging with A. Iselin & Co., also one of Wall Street's oldest firms. Several months earlier the patriarch of the firm, Adrian Iselin, died at the age of 89. He had joined the firm, which his father Adrian Georg Iselin formed, as a 22-year-old in 1868. At the time of the merger, Dominick & Dominick had 13 partners, including Gayer G. Dominick (senior partner since 1926), Bayard Dominick, and Gardner Dominick Stout. It next picked up several partners from Iselin & Co., as well as Iselin Securities Corporation, which brought with it an office in Paris, and the Iselin Corporation of Canada with its office in Montreal. Because Dominick & Dominick already maintained a London office, the London office of Iselin Securities was closed.
Other European offices were subsequently opened, and Dominick & Dominick soon had a presence in all of the major cities in Europe.

World War II

A large number of the firm's employees and partners entered the military, including Gayer Dominick. The firm was content to just keep its doors opened and operate. Gayer Dominick had been with the firm since 1909 after graduating from Yale University. In 1935 he was elected a governor of the New York Stock Exchange and helped to hire the first paid president of the Exchange, at the behest of the new Securities and Exchange Commission (SEC). He then left the family firm in 1938 to enter public service, working for the Office of Price Administration in the Roosevelt administration.

Post-War expansion

After World War II came to an end and following a brief economic recession as the United States reverted to a peacetime footing, the economy enjoyed a long period of growth. Dominick & Dominick benefited from the country's prosperity. Some of the firm's most notable transactions during the postwar years involved Yonkers, New York-based  Alexander Smith Carpet Company and Canada's Great Plains Oil. In the late 1950s Dominick & Dominick was also part of a banking syndicate that managed the initial public offering (IPO) of stock issued by Arvida Corporation, which was formed in Florida in 1958 to sell the real estate holdings of Arthur Vining Davis. The IPO gained attention because of objections raised by the SEC to the way the managers had announced the stock sale before filing a registration statement with the SEC, a violation of the law.

Dominick & Dominick ended registration as a partnership, reorganizing as a corporation in 1964. The 1960s also saw the firm spread its operation across the country, acquiring the investment bank of Buffalo based Schoellkopf, Hutton & Pomeroy, and taking advantage of a bull market to build up a domestic retail brokerage business. In 1962 an office in Chicago was opened. Dominick & Dominick gained a major presence in New England in 1966 by acquiring the firm of Townsend, Dabney, Tyson. Not only did the firm pick up a large Boston office but another 15 offices throughout the Northeast. About 30 additional branch offices across the United States were opened by the end of the 1960s.

In 1970 Dominick & Dominick pursued a merger with Clark, Dodge & Co., Inc., a similar size firm, but called it off, electing instead to continue a program of opening new offices and pursuing the acquisition of smaller firms. This plan was also eventually terminated, however, as the stock market began to experience one of the worst bear markets in a generation, and Dominick & Dominick found that it had stretched itself far too thin.

Dark period
Strapped for cash the firm sold four of its five seats on the New York Stock Exchange and one of two seats on the American Stock Exchange. It also sold a significant stake in the business for $7.25 million to an investment group led by Pierce National Life Insurance Company (now Liberty Corporation), which was in turn controlled by Joe L. Allbritton, founder of Allbritton Communications Company. While the infusion of capital was welcome, Dominick & Dominick still found itself in a difficult position and decided to exit the domestic retail brokerage business and to sell the bulk of its branch offices.
The firm's chairman and chief executive, Peter M. Kennedy, explained to the New York Times that "a national retail structure is not right for a firm of our size. We either had to be bigger or smaller." He added, "We are not going out of business. We are just changing the nature of our business."
Dominick & Dominick retained a modest retail business but mostly chose to focus on core strengths, including institutional business, money management, corporate finance, municipal bonds, and its international business. It was also in 1973 The Dominick fund, which had about $55 million in assets, was taken over by Putnam Fund.

Over the next 20 years, Dominick & Dominick reduced its work force and closed offices in an attempt to focus on more profitable financial services such as research. The firm also became involved in the fixed income area, making corporate and municipal bonds, Eurobonds, and Treasury Notes available to its clients, and launched managed futures programs to participate in the global currency markets. The firm also did a healthy business providing clearing services to more than 100 National Association of Securities Dealers firms; its Dominick & Dominick Advisors unit provided investment and portfolio management services to high-net-worth investors and institutions in the United States, Europe, and Asia.

21st century
By the start of the new century, Dominick & Dominick was in decline and needed an infusion of partner capital. In October 2003 the firm brought in a new president and CEO, hiring 58-year-old Michael J. Campbell, a former Marine who had 30 years of experience in the industry, including a 25-year tenure with Donaldson, Lufkin & Jenrette (DLJ) and a stint with Credit Suisse First Boston after Credit Suisse acquired DLJ. With DLJ Campbell managed the private client group, expanding the firm's high-net-worth and midsized institutional investor brokerage business from 75 advisors to a network of more than 500 investment professionals.

Campbell joined Dominick & Dominick in 2003, bringing senior management from DLJ and Credit Suisse First Boston. The new management relocated the firm headquarters from lower Manhattan to Midtown Manhattan to an office on 52nd St. In addition, Campbell wasted little time in recruiting new advisors from Credit Suisse and other major financial firms.

Dominick & Dominick's first branch office to open under Campbell's management was in the fall of 2004 when an operation in Miami was opened to focus on wealthy Central and South American residents. It was not an acquisition, as Dominick was absorbing the Miami office of Pennsylvania-based First Security Investments, which had been opened by another former DLJ employee, Alain O'Hayon, who stayed on to manage the office. Campbell was very familiar with the potential of a Miami operation, having built up an office in the city for DLJ from just two brokers to more than 70.

In 2006 another regional office was added in Atlanta.

A year later, in 2007, Dominick & Dominick launched a new risk arbitrage group with the hope to develop synergies with the firm's existing institutional and high-net-worth client base.

Stanford Financial Group receivership
On November 13, 2009, the US District Court ordered the Brokerage Accounts of Stanford Financial Group Brokerage to be transferred to Dominick & Dominick LLC. The Stanford Group was the firm run by Allen Stanford. Both Stanford Group Company and Dominick & Dominick LLC use Pershing LLC as their clearing firm. The transfer became effective on January 20, 2010.

References
Notes

Bibliography
 Allan, John H. "Two Wall Street Firms Undergo Changes." The New York Times 22 Feb. 1973: n. pag. Print.
 New York Times. "Anniversary Celebrated: Dominick & Dominick, Brokers, Oberve Fiftieth Year in Business." The New York Times 15 June 1920: n. pag. Print
 Staff. "Dominick Branches Sold to Other Firms." The New York Times 8 Aug. 1973: n. pag. Print.
 Staff. "Iselin Firm to End, Joining Dominicks." The New YOrk Times 17 June 1973: n. pag. Print.
 Vartan, Vartanig G. "Dominick to Quit Retail Brokerage." The New York Times 31 July 1973: n. pag. Print
 Dominick & Dominick LLC Homepage. "About US." Dominick & Dominick LLC. N.p., n.d. Web. 27 Apr. 2011. <http://www.dominickanddominick.com/>.

External links
 

Financial services companies established in 1870
Investment companies based in New York City
Privately held companies based in New York City
Financial services companies based in New York City
Brokerage firms
1870 establishments in New York (state)